The Ministry of Consumer Affairs, Food and Public Distribution is a government ministry of India. The ministry is headed by a Cabinet rank minister.

Departments 
The ministry is divided into two departments,  the Department of Food and Public Distribution and the Department of Consumer Affairs.

Department of Food and Public Distribution

The objectives of the department are to ensure:

remunerative rates for the farmers.
supply of food grains at reasonable prices through the public distribution system.

Public Distribution System

The Indian Public Distribution System (PDS) is a national food security system that distributes subsidised food to India's poor. Major commodities include wheat, rice, sugar and kerosene. Surpluses of food from increased crop yields (as a result of the Green Revolution and good monsoon seasons) are managed by the Food Corporation of India, established by the Food Corporation Act 1964. The system implements national policy for farm price support, operations, procurement, storage, preservation, inter-state movement and distribution. PDS has a network of about 478,000 Fair Price Shops (FPS), perhaps the largest distribution network of its type in the world, operated by the Union Government and state governments.

Department of Consumer Affairs

The department administers the policies for Consumer Cooperatives, price monitoring, essential commodity availability, consumer movement and control of statutory bodies such as the Bureau of Indian Standards(BIS) and Weights and Measures.

The department is responsible for:

National Test House
Standards of Weights and Measures
The Bureau of Indian Standards
Consumer Cooperatives
Forward Markets Commission, Mumbai
Monitoring of Prices and Availability of essential commodities
The Consumer Protection Act, 2019
Consumer Welfare Fund
 Internal Trade
 Inter-State Trade: The Spirituous Preparations (Inter-State Trade and Commerce) Control Act, 1955 (39 of 1955).
 Control of Futures Trading: the Forward Contracts (Regulations) Act, 1952 (74 of 1952).

The department regulates the availability and prescribes measures to see that the system works towards the food security of vulnerable people. This intent is to increase dignity, accountability, visibility, positive orientation and changed mind set.

Ministers

Food & Agriculture (1947-71)

Food & Civil Supplies (1983-91)

Food (1991-96)

Civil Supplies, Consumer Affairs & Public Distribution (1991-96)

Consumer Affairs, Food & Public Distribution (1996-present)

See also

 Department of Co-operation, Food and Consumer Protection (Tamil Nadu)
 Ministry of Co-operation

References 
Ministry of Consumer Affairs, Food and Public Distribution

 
Consumer
Welfare in India
Consumer protection in India
Consumer ministries